Giacomo Rocca (or Giacomo della Rocca) (died between 1592 and 1605) was an Italian painter of the late Renaissance or Mannerist period. He was a pupil of Daniele da Volterra, and aided in completion of frescoes for the first chapel on the right of Santa Maria degli Angeli in Rome. Rocca's biography is sketched in Giovanni Baglione's Le vite de' pittori, scultori et architetti dal pontificato di Gregorio XIII del 1572 in fino a tempi di Papa Urbano VIII nel 1642.

Works
Frescoes in the Ricci Chapel, San Pietro in Montorio
Prophets and Sibyls and Subjects in the Old Testament, frescoes at the Galleria and the Palazzo Sacchetti chapel in Rome
Roman Triumphs, frescos (worked with Michele degli Alberti) at the Palazzo dei Conservatori, Rome

References
Santa Maria degli Angeli description.

Further reading
Paul Joannides, The Drawings of Michelangelo and his Followers in the Ashmolean Museum, University of Cambridge, also as an e-book

16th-century Italian painters
Italian male painters
17th-century Italian painters
Italian Mannerist painters
1605 deaths